Deltoya is the third studio album by Spanish hard rock band Extremoduro. It was produced by Extremoduro, recorded and published by Dro Records in 1992. The album has a more erotic—and less social—theme than the previous discs, and most of the lyrics are adaptations of the poems by Kiko "Luna Creciente", Tomás Rodríguez (the band's manager) and Manolo Chinato. The album includes the voices and participation of other artists, such as Argentinian singer and guitarist Ariel Rot in "Volando solo".

Track listing

2011 edition bonus tracks

  *  Bonus tracks are on their 2004 version.

Personnel 
Extremoduro
 Robe Iniesta – Guitar and vocals
 Salo – Guitar
 Carlos "el Sucio" – Bass
 Luis "von Fanta" – Drums
Additional personnel
 María – Vocals on Sol de Invierno, Con un Latido del Reloj, Papel Secante and Ama, Ama, Ama y Ensancha el Alma
 Belén – Vocals on Sol de Invierno, Con un Latido del Reloj, Papel Secante and Ama, Ama, Ama y Ensancha el Alma
 Salvador – Guitar on De Acero and Relación Convencional
 Rafa Kas – Guitar, keyboards and vocals on Lucha Contigo
 Ariel Rot – Guitar on Volando Sólo
 Luisma – Vocals on Papel Secante

Certifications

References

External links 
 Extremoduro official website (in Spanish)

1992 albums
Extremoduro albums
Spanish-language albums